Aventinka may refer to:
Aventinka, a diminutive of the Russian male first name Aventin
Aventinka, a diminutive of the Russian female first name Aventina